Misaki Doi and Natalia Vikhlyantseva were the defending champions but Doi chose not to participate. Vikhlyantseva played alongside Olga Govortsova but lost in the first round to Cornelia Lister and Erin Routliffe.

Mirjam Björklund and Leonie Küng won the title, defeating Tereza Mihalíková and Kamilla Rakhimova in the final, 5–7, 6–3, [10–5].

Seeds

Draw

Draw

References

External Links
Main Draw

Swedish Open - Doubles
2021 Women's Doubles